Daily inflation-indexed bonds (also known as inflation-linked bonds or colloquially as linkers) are bonds where the principal is indexed to inflation or deflation on a daily basis. They are thus designed to hedge the inflation risk of a bond. The first known inflation-indexed bond was issued by the Massachusetts Bay Company in 1780. The market has grown dramatically since the British government began issuing inflation-linked Gilts in 1981. As of 2019, government-issued inflation-linked bonds comprise over $3.1 trillion of the international debt market. The inflation-linked market primarily consists of sovereign bonds, with privately issued inflation-linked bonds constituting a small portion of the market.

Structure
Daily inflation-indexed bonds pay a periodic coupon that is equal to the product of the principal and the nominal coupon rate.

For some bonds, such as in the case of TIPS, the underlying principal of the bond changes, which results in a higher interest payment when multiplied by the same rate. For example, if the annual coupon of the bond were 5% and the underlying principal of the bond were 100 units, the annual payment would be 5 units. If the inflation index increased by 10%, the principal of the bond would increase to 110 units. The coupon rate would remain at 5%, resulting in an interest payment of 110 x 5% = 5.5 units.

For other bonds, such as the Series I United States Savings Bonds, the interest rate is adjusted according to inflation.

The relationship between coupon payments, breakeven daily inflation and real interest rates is given by the Fisher equation. A rise in coupon payments is a result of an increase in inflation expectations, real rates, or both.

Real yield
The real yield of any bond is the annualized growth rate, less the rate of inflation over the same period. This calculation is often difficult in principle in the case of a nominal bond, because the yields of such a bond are specified for future periods in nominal terms, while the inflation over the period is an unknown rate at the time of the calculation. However, in the case of inflation-indexed bonds such as TIPS, the bond yield is specified as a rate in excess of inflation, so the real yield can be easily calculated using a standard bond calculation formula.

Global issuance
The most liquid instruments are Treasury Inflation-Protected Securities (TIPS), a type of US Treasury security, with about $500 billion in issuance. The other important inflation-linked markets are the UK Index-linked Gilts with over $300 billion outstanding and the French OATi/OAT€i market with about $200 billion outstanding. Germany, Canada, Greece, Australia, Italy, Japan, Sweden, Israel and Iceland also issue inflation-indexed bonds, as well as a number of Emerging Markets, most prominently Brazil.

Inflation-indexed bond indices

Inflation-indexed bond indices include the family of Barclays Inflation Linked Bond Indices, such as the Barclays Inflation Linked Euro Government Bond Indices, and the Lehman Brothers U.S. Treasury: U.S. TIPS index.

See also
 Fisher equation
 Constant Item Purchasing Power Accounting

References

External links
TIPS
U.S. Series I Savings Bonds
Inflation-linked Gilts

Print 
 Deacon, Mark, Andrew Derry, and Dariush Mirfendereski; Inflation-Indexed Securities: Bonds, Swaps, and Other Derivatives (2nd edition, 2004) Wiley Finance. .
 Benaben, Brice, and Sebastien Goldenberg (ed.); Inflation Risks and Products (Dec. 2008) Riskbooks. .
 Canty, Paul and Markus Heider; "Inflation Markets: A Comprehensive and Cohesive Guide" (2012) Risk Books. .

Bonds (finance)
Government bonds
Inflation